John Richmond (born 23 February 1943) is a former Australian rules footballer who played for Richmond in the Victorian Football League (VFL) during the early 1960s.

Richmond was recruited from Murrumbeena and could only manage four appearances in his first two league seasons. He played 13 games with Richmond in 1964 and kicked 14 goals.

A ruck rover, he could also play as a centre half forward and after leaving Richmond spent some time at Clarence. He won the William Leitch Medal in 1967 and represented Tasmania in the 1969 Adelaide Carnival.

References

Holmesby, Russell and Main, Jim (2007). The Encyclopedia of AFL Footballers. 7th ed. Melbourne: Bas Publishing.

1943 births
Living people
Richmond Football Club players
Clarence Football Club players
William Leitch Medal winners
Australian rules footballers from Victoria (Australia)